Noyers is a former commune in the department of Indre-et-Loire, France, annexed in 1832 to Nouâtre. In the Middle Ages, it was home to the Benedictine Noyers Abbey.

Demographics

References

Villages in Centre-Val de Loire